The weaver beetle (Lamia textor) is a species of beetle from subfamily Lamiinae in long-horned beetle family; it is a North Asia species. Larvae develop in willow trees, rare in birch and poplar.

Distributed everywhere in Western Europe, except extreme north, also distributed in Central and Eastern Europe, Siberia (meets on territories where appropriate these species food plants, starting from southern part of tundra), Caucasus, South Caucasus (rare), Sakhalin, in northern and western parts of Kazakhstan, Japan, Korea and in northeast of China.

Imago is 15–32 mm long. Egg is 4.5–5 mm in length, and 1.2–1.4 mm in diameter.

References

External links

Lamiini
Woodboring beetles
Building defects
Beetles described in 1758